Bartolomé Araujo Fortunato (born August 24, 1974) is a former baseball pitcher.

He made his Major League debut on June 29, 2004, against the Toronto Blue Jays.

Fortunato was traded to the New York Mets along with Victor Zambrano as part of a controversial deal that sent top Mets prospect Scott Kazmir to Tampa Bay. After pitching well late in 2004, he spent the entire  season on the disabled list with a herniated disc. After signing with the San Francisco Giants in spring training , Fortunato was released by the Giants on June 15.

On July 6, 2008, Fortunato signed with the Calgary Vipers of the Golden Baseball League. On July 10, the Vipers traded him to the St. George Roadrunners for a PTBNL. On August 23, 2010 Fortunato signed with the Bridgeport Bluefish. He last played for the Edmonton Capitals of the North American League.

Fortunato is single and resides in Santo Domingo.

References

External links

1974 births
Living people
Acereros de Monclova players
Bakersfield Blaze players
Bridgeport Bluefish players
Calgary Vipers players
Dominican Republic expatriate baseball players in Canada
Dominican Republic expatriate baseball players in Mexico
Dominican Republic expatriate baseball players in the United States
Durham Bulls players
Edmonton Capitals players
Fresno Grizzlies players
Gigantes del Cibao players
Hudson Valley Renegades players

Leones del Escogido players
Major League Baseball players from the Dominican Republic
Major League Baseball pitchers
Mexican League baseball pitchers
New York Mets players
Norfolk Tides players
Orlando Rays players
Princeton Devil Rays players
Sportspeople from Santo Domingo
St. George Roadrunners players
Tampa Bay Devil Rays players